
Year 680 (DCLXXX) was a leap year starting on Sunday (link will display the full calendar) of the Julian calendar. The denomination 680 for this year has been used since the early medieval period, when the Anno Domini calendar era became the prevalent method in Europe for naming years.

Events 
 By place 

 Byzantine Empire 
 Byzantine–Bulgarian War: The Bulgars under Asparukh subjugate the country of current-day Bulgaria, north of the Balkan Mountains. Emperor Constantine IV leads a combined land and sea operation against the invaders and besieges their fortified camp in Dobruja.
 Battle of Ongal: The Byzantine army (25,000 men) under Constantine IV is defeated by the Bulgars and their Slavic allies in the Danube Delta. Bulgar cavalry force the Byzantines into a rout, while Constantine (suffering from leg pain) travels to Nesebar to seek treatment.

 Europe 
 King Wamba is deposed after an 8-year reign, and forced to retire to a monastery. He is succeeded by Erwig who becomes ruler of the Visigothic Kingdom. 
 King Perctarit makes his son Cunipert co-ruler of the Lombard Kingdom. He signs a formal peace treaty with Constantine IV. 
 Pippin of Herstal becomes Mayor of the Palace of Austrasia.
The emporium (market town) of Dorestad is founded near the mouth of the Rhine, and soon becomes a major trading settlement in the North Sea region (approximate date).

 Britain 
 King Cædwalla of Wessex becomes overly ambitious in a power-struggle with his rival, King Centwine, for Wessex overlordship. He is banished into the forests of Chiltern and Andred.

 Arabian Empire 
 Yazid I, son of Muawiyah I, becomes the sixth caliph (second Umayyad caliph) but Kufans in Mesopotamia rebel and invite Hussein ibn Ali (grandson of Muhammad) to take the throne.
 October 10 – Battle of Karbala: Forces under Yazid I kill Hussein ibn Ali and his closest supporters. This event leads to the civil war known as the Second Fitna.

 Asia 

 In Japan, Princess Uno Sarara is unwell, and Emperor Tenmu begins the erection of the Temple of Yakushi-ji (Nara Prefecture). He makes 100 people enter religion as priests, wishing her to recover her health.

 By topic 

 Religion 
 September 17 – Theodore of Tarsus, archbishop of Canterbury, convenes a synod at Hatfield that clears the English Church from any association with the heresy of monothelitism.
 November 7 – The Third Council of Constantinople (Sixth Ecumenical Council) opens in Constantinople to settle the theological controversies of monoenergism and monothelitism, ending September 16, 681.
 Wilfrid returns to Northumbria, with papal support, but is imprisoned by King Ecgfrith, and again exiled. He travels to the Kingdom of Sussex and begins to evangelise the people.
 King Merewalh of Magonsæte founds the monastery of Wenlock Priory in Shropshire, England, appointing his daughter Milburga as Benedictine abbess.
 Approximate date
 Boniface begins his education at an English Celtic Christian monastery, probably in Exeter near his birthplace and one of many monasteriola built by local landowners and churchmen. 
 The Book of Durrow is created, probably in Northumbria or on the island of Iona in the Scottish Inner Hebrides.

Births 
 Ali Asghar ibn Husayn, Son of 3rd shia Imam. Killed in Karbala (d. 680)
 Fujiwara no Muchimaro, Japanese politician (d. 737)
 Genshō, empress of Japan (d. 748)
 Oda of Scotland, Christian saint (approximate date)
 Wu Daozi, Chinese painter (d. 760)

Deaths 
 January 1 – Javanshir, king of Caucasian Albania (b. 616)
 January 30 – Balthild, queen of the Franks
 October 9 – Ghislain, Frankish anchorite and saint 
 October 10
 Abbas ibn Ali, son of Imam Ali
 Ali al-Akbar ibn Husayn, son of Al-Husayn
 Ali al-Asghar ibn Husayn, son of Al-Husayn
 Habib ibn Madhahir 
 Husayn ibn Ali, third Shia Imam and grandson of Muhammad (b. 626)K
 Agatho, pope of the Coptic Orthodox Church
 Bhāskara I, Indian mathematician (approximate date)
 Cædmon, Northumbrian poet 
 Ebroin, Mayor of the Palace of Neustria (or 681)
 Hilda of Whitby, Northumbrian abbess and saint
 Muawiyah I, founder of the Umayyad Caliphate (b. 602)
 Umm Salama, wife of Muhammad
 Vikramaditya I, king of Chalukya (India)
 Wulfoald, Mayor of the Palace of Austrasia

References

Sources

 
 
 
 
 
 

 

da:680'erne#680